Tristan DeLoach (born August 2, 2002) is an American professional soccer player who plays as a midfielder for Clemson Tigers.

Career
Born in Savannah, Georgia, DeLoach signed a professional contract with USL League One side Tormenta on May 8, 2019. He became the first player from Tormenta's academy to sign a professional contract with the club. After appearing as a substitute in two matches, DeLoach made his professional debut for Tormenta on July 24, 2019 against Orlando City B. He came on as a 82nd-minute substitute for Charlie Dennis as Tormenta won 4–1.

In the fall of 2021, DeLoach moved to play college soccer at Clemson University.

Career statistics

References

External links 
 USL League One Profile.

2002 births
Living people
Tormenta FC players
Association football midfielders
Soccer players from Georgia (U.S. state)
USL League One players
American soccer players
Sportspeople from Savannah, Georgia
Clemson Tigers men's soccer players